Yvie Jones (born 19 November 1972) is an Australian television personality, known for appearing alongside Angie Kent on Gogglebox Australia from 2015 to 2018.

Career
Jones left Gogglebox Australia in December 2018. In January 2019, it was announced that Angie Kent and Jones would be appearing on the fifth season of I'm a Celebrity...Get Me Out of Here!, which began airing on 13 January 2019. Jones was the series' runner-up, losing to Richard Reid. She is a regular panellist on Studio 10 and The Project.

In June 2019, it was announced that Jones would fill in for Fifi Box on Fox FM's breakfast show, Fifi, Fev & Byron, while Box was on maternity leave. On 3 October 2019, the Hit Network announced that Jones would be joined by Grant Denyer during December to host the Grant and Yvie Show, a Summer breakfast show that would air on all of their major metro markets, except 2Day FM.

In 2020 she appeared in two episodes of Network 10’s Drunk History Australia.

In 2021 she started the podcast Two Girls One Pod for Nova Podcasts with her best friend Angie Kent. Later in 2021 she started appearing as a co-presenter on the cooking competition show Snackmasters on the Nine Network, appearing alongside Poh Ling Yeow and Scott Pickett.

Television

References

1972 births
Australian television personalities
Women television personalities
Living people
People from Sydney